"Senseless" is a song by British rapper Stefflon Don. It was released as a single through Polydor on 18 May 2018, peaking at number 63 on the UK Singles Chart. The song was written by Stefflon Don and Rymez, the latter of whom also produced the song. A remix, featuring Canadian rapper Tory Lanez, was released on 12 November 2018.

The song received a Silver certification from the BPI in March 2019 for exceeding sales of 200,000.

Track listing

Charts

Certifications

References

2018 singles
2018 songs
Stefflon Don songs
Polydor Records singles
Songs written by Stefflon Don